Bore is a small cove indenting the mid part of Jossac Bight on the south coast of South Georgia. Surveyed by the SGS in the period 1951–57. The name is well established in local use.

References

Geography of Antarctica